Fredrick Dewayne Coleman (born January 31, 1975) is a former professional American football wide receiver.  He has played in the National Football League, Arena Football League and the XFL. Coleman graduated from Robert E. Lee High School in Tyler, Texas, and played for the Lee Red Raiders. Coleman only had two career receptions in the NFL, but one was a vital 46 yard slant play during the New England Patriots' 17–16 comeback win in Week 12 in 2001 against the Jets. His other catch came in week 17 against the Panthers. Coleman was also a contributor on special teams, as the Patriots made their way through the playoffs and onto the victory in Super Bowl XXXVI.

References

External links
New England Patriots Biography 
Austin Wranglers Biography
NFL stats
AFL stats

1975 births
Living people
Sportspeople from Tyler, Texas
Players of American football from Texas
American football wide receivers
Washington Huskies football players
Buffalo Bills players
Philadelphia Eagles players
New York Jets players
Chicago Enforcers players
Chicago Bears players
New England Patriots players
San Francisco 49ers players
San Jose SaberCats players
Atlanta Falcons players
Nashville Kats players
Austin Wranglers players
Georgia Force players